Laura Frederikke Worsøe Nielsen (born October 28, 2001 in Odense) is a Danish soccer player who plays goalkeeper for Sundby Boldklub in the Elite Division and for the Denmark national team.

Career

Club team 
Since 10 September 2018, Worsøe has appeared for Odense Q as both a league and 1st division team.  In the 2021/22 season, she won the basic game with the club in the 1st Division, but did not win the qualification series and thus did not advance to the Gjensidige Kvindeliga.

National team 
She has appeared several times for the Danish youth national teams and participated in the 2018 Under-19 European Championship in Switzerland at just 16 years old. 

In May 2022, she was selected for the senior national team for the first time, for an official friendly match against Austria in Wiener Neustadt.  She was substituted after the break in the 46th minute, as a replacement for Katrine Svane. Here she kept a clean sheet until the final whistle in Denmark's 2–1 victory. 

Subsequently, on 16 June of the same year, she was selected for national coach Lars Søndergaard's squad for the 2022 European Championship in England.

Web links 

 Laura Worsøe profile on WorldFootball.net 
 Laura Worsøe player profile on Soccerdonna.de 
 Laura Worsøe player profile on Soccerway 
 Laura Worsøe profile on Soccerway

References 

2001 births
Living people
Danish women's footballers
Odense Q players
Denmark women's youth international footballers
Denmark women's international footballers
Association football goalkeepers
Women's association football goalkeepers
Denmark international footballers